Belhi may refer to:

Belhi, Sarlahi, Janakpur, Nepal
Belhi, Siraha, Sagarmatha, Nepal
Belhi, Saptari, Nepal